4th SDFCS Awards
December 20, 1999

Best Film: 
 American Beauty 
The 4th San Diego Film Critics Society Awards, given by the San Diego Film Critics Society on 20 December 1999, honored the best in film for 1999.

Winners
Best Actor: 
Kevin Spacey - American Beauty
Best Actress: 
Annette Bening - American Beauty
Best Director: 
David Lynch - The Straight Story
Best Film: 
American Beauty
Best Foreign Language Film: 
Tango (Tango, no me dejes nunca) • Spain/Argentina
Best Screenplay - Original: 
Being John Malkovich - Charlie Kaufman
Best Screenplay - Adapted : 
Election - Alexander Payne and Jim Taylor
Best Supporting Actor: 
Philip Seymour Hoffman - Flawless
Best Supporting Actress: 
Thora Birch - American Beauty
Career Achievement Award: 
Chow Yun-fat

1
1999 film awards
1999 in American cinema